1969 is a collaborative studio album by American band Pink Martini and Japanese singer Saori Yuki, released in Japan on October 12, 2011, by EMI Music Japan and in the 
United States on November 1, 2011, by Heinz Records.

As of October 2013, the album had sold over 500,000 copies in Japan.

Track listing

Charts

Weekly charts

Year-end charts

Certifications

References

2011 albums
Collaborative albums
EMI Music Japan albums
Heinz Records albums
Japanese-language albums
Pink Martini albums